The Madesh Samata Party Nepal ( is a political party in Nepal. It is led by Meghraj Sahani.

The Madesh Samata Party won 1 seat in the 2013 Nepalese Constituent Assembly election.

References

Political parties in Nepal